Sarsaz (Harıhaź) is a rural locality (a village) in Dyurtyulinsky Selsoviet, Sharansky District, Bashkortostan, Russia. The population was 273 as of 2010. There are 6 streets.

Geography 
Sarsaz is located 13 km southwest of Sharan (the district's administrative centre) by road. Tat-Kuchuk is the nearest rural locality.

References 

Rural localities in Sharansky District